The Harvard Crimson women's ice hockey team represents Harvard University in National Collegiate Athletic Association (NCAA) Division I women's hockey. Harvard competes as a member of the ECAC Conference and plays its home games at the Bright Hockey Center in Boston, Massachusetts.

History
The Harvard Crimson "iced" its first regular season women's hockey team in the 1978–79 season. Their first game was a 17–0 defeat at the hands of the Providence Friars women's ice hockey program. The next game was a 2–1 loss to the Yale Bulldogs women's ice hockey program.

In 1998–99, the Crimson finished with a record of 33–1. Of the 31 wins, the Crimson won 30 consecutive games to close the season. In the previous season, the Crimson went 14–16–0. The final game of that 30 game streak was a 6–5 overtime victory over the New Hampshire Wildcats women's ice hockey program in the American Women's College Hockey Alliance (AWCHA) national championship game. During the season, the Crimson would win the Beanpot and Ivy League title.  In addition, the Crimson won their first ECAC regular-season and tournament championships. This would be Katey Stone's first AWCHA national championship.

In 2001, Harvard participated in the inaugural NCAA Championship tournament. On January 18, 2003, Harvard beat the Boston College Eagles women's ice hockey program by a 17–2 mark, the largest margin of victory in NCAA history. Jennifer Botterill set an NCAA record (since tied) for most points in one game with 10. This was accomplished on January 28, 2003 versus Boston College. A few months later, Nicole Corriero tied Botterill's record for most points in one NCAA game with ten. She accomplished the feat on November 7, 2003 versus the Union Dutchwomen. In addition, she holds the NCAA record for most game winning goals in a career with 27. During the 2003–04 season, Nicole Corriero would set an NCAA record with 59 goals scored in a season. On February 26, 2010, head coach Katey Stone became the women’s college hockey all-time wins leader, surpassing former University of Minnesota head coach Laura Halldorson.

Season by season results

Note: GP = Games played, W = Wins, L = Losses, T = Ties
Records as of July 31, 2009.

Coaches

Katey Stone has been the head coach of the Crimson since 1994. Her teams have accomplished the following:
 Six ECAC regular season titles
 Six ECAC tournament championships
 Seven Ivy League Championships
 10 Beanpot Championships
 Nine NCAA tournament appearances
 Three NCAA title game appearances
 American Women Hockey Coaches Association (AWCHA) championship (1999)

Players

2022–23 roster
As of February 10, 2023.

Players with international experience
 Jennifer Botterill, Team Canada
 Caitlin Cahow, Team USA
 Julie Chu, Team USA
 Jillian Dempsey, Team USA
 Lyndsey Fry, Team USA
 Michelle Picard, Team USA
 Josephine Pucci, Team USA
 Angela Ruggiero, Team USA
 Tammy Lee Shewchuk, Team Canada
 Sarah Vaillancourt, Team Canada
 Jamie Hagerman, Team USA

Championships
 1-time women's national champions (1999, crowned by AWCHA, pre-dated NCAA Women's "Frozen Four")
 6-time ECAC women's champions (1999, 2004–08)
 5-time ECAC women's regular-season champions (1999, 2003–05, 2008)
 10-time Ivy League Champion (1987–89, 1999, 2003, 2005, 2008–09, 2013–14)

Beanpot championships

 1982
1983
1992
1995 
1999
2000
2001
2002
2003
 2004
 2005
 2008
 2010
 2015
 2022

Notable players

Jennifer Botterill is the only player to have won the Patty Kazmaier Award twice.
 Jennifer Botterill
 Julie Chu
 Lyndsey Fry
 Allison Mleczko
 Michelle Picard
 Josephine Pucci
 Angela Ruggiero

Career scoring

Olympians

Awards and honors

 Ashley Banfield, Defense, 2002 ECAC North All-Rookie Team
 Cori Bassett, Senior, Defense, 2010 Honorable Mention
 Jennifer Botterill, 1999 American Women's College Hockey Alliance All-Americans, First Team
 Jennifer Botterill, AHCA First Team All-American, 2003
 Jennifer Botterill, Patty Kazmaier Award Winner, 2001
 Jennifer Botterill, Patty Kazmaier Award Winner, 2003
 Jenny Brine, Honorable Mention All-Ivy League, 2007–08, Forward, Harvard (Junior)
 Caitlin Cahow, 2006–07 ECAC Coaches Preseason All-League Selection
 Caitlin Cahow, 2008 ECAC Tournament Most Valuable Player,
 Caitlin Cahow, First Team All-Ivy League, 2007–08, Defenseman, Harvard (Senior), Unanimous selection
 Julie Chu, 2006–07 ECAC Coaches Preseason All-League Selection
 Julie Chu, 2006–07 ECAC Media Preseason All-League Selection
 Julie Chu, AHCA Second Team All-American
 Julie Chu, NCAA Frozen Four All-Tournament Team
 Nicole Corriero, Forward, 2001–02 New England Hockey Writers Women's Division I All-Star Team
 Nicole Corriero, Forward, 2002 ECAC North All-Rookie Team
 Nicole Corriero, Forward, 2002 ECAC North Second Team
 Nicole Corriero, 2002 ECAC-North Rookie of the Year
 Nicole Corriero, Beanpot Most Valuable Player (2005)
 Nicole Corriero, 2005 Sarah Devens Award
 Nicole Corriero, 2005 ECAC Player of the Year
 Nicole Corriero, 2005 ECAC Tournament Most Valuable Player,
 Nicole Corriero, 2005 Ivy League Player of the Year
 Nicole Corriero, 2005 First team All-ECAC
 Nicole Corriero, 2005 First Team All-Ivy
 Nicole Corriero, Most Outstanding Player at the 2005 ECAC Women’s Hockey League Championships.
 Randi Griffin, ECAC Offensive Player of the Week (Week of February 22, 2010)
 Sue Guay, Beanpot Most Valuable Player (1991)
 Jamie Hagerman, Defense, 2001–02 New England Hockey Writers Women's Division I All-Star Team
 Jamie Hagerman, Defense, 2002 All-ECAC North Honorable Mention
 Christina Kessler, Bertagna Award (top goalie at Beanpot)
 Christina Kessler, First Team All-Ivy League, 2007–08, Defenseman, Harvard (Sophomore)
 Christina Kessler, 2009 Second Team All-ECAC
 Christina Kessler, Goaltender, Senior, 2010 Honorable Mention
 Kalen Ingram, Forward, 2001–02 New England Hockey Writers Women's Division I All-Star Team
 Kalen Ingram, Forward, 2002 ECAC North Second Team
 Alison Kuusisto, Bertagna Award (top goalie at Beanpot)
 Anna McDonald, 2010 Frozen Four Skills Competition participant
 A.J. Mleczko, 1999 American Women's College Hockey Alliance All-Americans, First Team
 A.J. Mleczko, Beanpot Most Valuable Player (1999)
 A.J. Mleczko, Patty Kazmaier Award Winner, 1999
 Josephine Pucci, 2010–11 New England Women's Division I All-Stars
 Angela Ruggiero, 1999 American Women's College Hockey Alliance All-Americans, First Team
 Angela Ruggiero AHCA First Team All-American
 Angela Ruggiero, NCAA Frozen Four All-Tournament Team
 Angela Ruggiero, Top Three Finalist for 2003 Patty Kazmaier Award
 Angela Ruggiero, Patty Kazmaier Award Winner, 2004
 Angela Ruggiero, 2004 ECAC Tournament Most Valuable Player,
 Katey Stone, AWCHA Women’s Coach of the Year (1999)
 Tammy Lee Shewchuk, 1999, 2000, 2001 ECAC All-Tournament team
 Tammy Lee Shewchuk, 1999 American Women's College Hockey Alliance All-Americans, First Team
 Tammy Lee Shewchuk, Top Three Finalist for 2001 Patty Kazmaier Award
 Cheryl Tate, Beanpot Most Valuable Player (1982, 1983)
 Sarah Vaillancourt, Top 10 Finalist for 2007 Patty Kazmaier Award
 Sarah Vaillancourt, Patty Kazmaier Award Winner, 2008
 Sarah Vaillancourt, Forward, First Team All-Ivy League, 2007–08, Harvard (Junior), Unanimous selection
 Sarah Vaillancourt, Ivy League Player of the Year 2007–08, Harvard (Junior), Unanimous selection
 Sarah Vaillancourt, 2009 First Team All-ECAC

Ivy League Awards
 Sandra Whyte, Ivy League Player of the Year (1990)
 Sandra Whyte, Ivy League Player of the Year (1991)

All-Ivy
 Kate Buesser, Forward, Junior, 2010 First Team All-Ivy
 Cori Bassett, Senior, Defense, 2010 Ivy League Honorable Mention
 Leanna Coskren, Defense, Junior, 2010 Second Team All-Ivy
 Jillian Dempsey, Forward, Freshman, 2010 Second Team All-Ivy
 Becca Gilmore, 2017-18 Second Team All-Ivy
 Kat Hughes, 2017-18 Honorable Mention All-Ivy
 Dominique Petrie,  2019-20 Second Team All-Ivy 
 Lindsay Reed, 2018-2019 First Team All-Ivy
Kristin Della Rovere, 2019-20 Honorable Mention All-Ivy
Ali Peper, D, Harvard, 2019-20 Honorable Mention All-Ivy 
Becky Dutton, G, Harvard, 2019-20 Honorable Mention All-Ivy

Beanpot Awards
 Sandra Whyte, Beanpot Most Valuable Player (1992)
 Erin Villotte, Beanpot Most Valuable Player (1995)
 Jennifer Botterill, Beanpot Most Valuable Player, 2000
 Jennifer Botterill, Beanpot Most Valuable Player, 2001
 Tracy Catlin, Beanpot Most Valuable Player (2002)
 Jennifer Botterill, Beanpot Most Valuable Player, 2003
 Sarah Wilson, Beanpot Most Valuable Player (2008)

Bertagna Award
 Ali Boe, Bertagna Award (top goalie at Beanpot)
 Lindsay Reed, Bertagna Award (top goalie Beanpot)

ECAC Awards
 Lindsay Charlebois, 2004 Sarah Devens Award
 Sarah Vaillancourt, 2009 ECAC Player of the Year

All-ECAC
 Jenny Brine, 2009 Third Team All-ECAC
 Lindsay Reed, 2019 Second Team All-ECAC

ECAC All-Rookie
 Jillian Dempsey, Harvard, 2010 ECAC All-Rookie Team
 Lindsay Reed, 2019 ECAC All-Rookie Team

ECAC Tournament
 Sarah Wilson, 2006 ECAC Tournament Most Valuable Player,

Statistical leaders
 Jennifer Botterill, NCAA leader, 2000–01 season, Goals per game, 2.60
 Jennifer Botterill, NCAA leader, 2002–03 season, Goals per game, 3.50
 Tammy Shewchuk, NCAA leader, 2000–01 season, Assists per game, 1.48

Crimson in professional hockey

See also
 Harvard Crimson men's ice hockey
 Harvard Crimson
 List of college women's ice hockey coaches with 250 wins (Katey Stone ranks fourth on all-time list)

References

External links
 

 
Ice hockey teams in Massachusetts